The 14th Canadian Folk Music Awards were presented on November 30 and December 1, 2018 in Calgary, Alberta.

Nominees and recipients
Recipients are listed first and highlighted in boldface.

References

External links
 Canadian Folk Music Awards

14
Canadian Folk Music Awards
Canadian Folk Music Awards
Canadian Folk Music Awards
Canadian Folk Music Awards
Canadian Folk Music Awards